Thomas Alexander Hickman,  (October 19, 1925 – January 10, 2016) was a Canadian lawyer, politician and judge.

Biography
Born in Grand Bank, Newfoundland (present-day Newfoundland and Labrador, Canada), Hickman studied at Memorial University of Newfoundland and received a LL.B from Dalhousie University in 1947. He was called to the Bar of Nova Scotia in 1947, and to the Bar of Newfoundland in 1948. In 1964, he was made a Queen's Counsel. He started to practice law in 1948.

From 1966 to 1979, he was a member of the Newfoundland House of Assembly. He held numerous cabinet positions including Minister of Justice and Attorney General, Minister of Health, Minister Responsible for Intergovernmental Affairs, Minister of Finance, and Minister of Education.

In 1979, he was appointed to the Supreme Court of Newfoundland as Chief Justice of the Trial Division. As Chief Justice, he was the chairman of two well known Royal Commissions. From 1982 to 1985, he was the chairman of the Royal Commission on the Ocean Ranger marine disaster. From 1986 to 1989, he was the chairman of the Royal Commission on the Donald Marshall, Jr.

Personal life
In 2003, he was made an Officer of the Order of Canada. Hickman died of cancer on January 10, 2016, at the age of 90.

References

External links
Order of Canada Citation
 

1925 births
2016 deaths
Judges in Newfoundland and Labrador
Schulich School of Law alumni
Officers of the Order of Canada
Members of the Executive Council of Newfoundland and Labrador
Lawyers in Newfoundland and Labrador
People from Grand Bank
Canadian King's Counsel
Progressive Conservative Party of Newfoundland and Labrador MHAs